Marijampolė Free Economic Zone or Baltic FEZ is a special economic zone located in Marijampolė, Lithuania. It has 77.73 ha area, which was established in 2011 December 23 near European route E67 and Rail Baltica. The zone was established for 49 years, specialize in four industries: Science, Forestry, Metalworking and Food processing, and is oriented to the investors from Scandinavian countries.

Infrastructure 

Marijampolė FEZ has 15 industrial type plots from which some are dedicated for medium-level pollution businesses. Using European Regional Development Funds every plot was developed with essential infrastructure: electricity, water, drainage, C and D class roads, lighting and gas pipelines as needed. There is also a planned connection to Rail Baltica.

Companies 

In 2018 Danish manufacturer Dovista plans to invest over €100 million over the next ten years to open new manufacturing line in Baltic FEZ. In 2018 May there was 20 ha of unoccupied industrial plots left. It is planned to expand FEZ territory as by Marijampolė region development strategy and international investors suggestions.

References

External links
 Official website

Economy of Marijampolė
Free economic zones of Lithuania
2011 establishments in Lithuania